Comment is an Australian television series which aired 1958 to 1960 on Sydney station ATN-7. In the series, George Baker interviewed prominent people. It aired in a single city only, typical of early Australian series. Archival status is not known.

References

External links

1958 Australian television series debuts
1960 Australian television series endings
Australian non-fiction television series
Black-and-white Australian television shows
Australian live television series
Australian television talk shows